Twilight's Last Gleaming is a 1977 German-American film directed by Robert Aldrich.

Twilight's Last Gleaming may also refer to:

"twilight's last gleaming", a phrase from the national anthem of the United States, "The Star-Spangled Banner"
Twilight's Last Gleaming (novel), a 2014 novel by John Michael Greer
Twilights Last Gleaming, a 1997 album by the British hip hop group Gunshot
Twilight's Last Gleaming Cross Country Challenge, an annual running race held in Ventura, California

See also
"Last Gleaming", a storyline in the Buffy the Vampire Slayer Season Eight comic book series